The Association of Reform Zionists of America (ARZA) is the Zionist organization of the Reform movement in the United States. It was founded in 1978.

History
ARZA was founded in 1978 after a resolution at the 1977 UAHC 54th General Assembly biennial convention.

ARZA is a member of the American Zionist Movement and, by extension, is part of the World Zionist Organization. In 2015, ARZA sent 56 delegates to the 37th World Zionist Congress after winning 40% of the US vote held by AZM. This was the single largest faction of the US delegation. Between the previous AZM WZC election in 2006 and the 2015 election, ARZA sent 56 delegates to the 2006 35th WZC and to the 2010 36th WZC.

Leaders
Lay leadership

Current Chairman: Rabbi Bennett Miller (2012-present)

Former Presidents
Rabbi Roland Gittelsohn (1978-1984)
Rabbi Charles Kroloff (1984-1989)
Norman Schwartz (1989-1993)
Marcia Cayne (1993-1995)
Philip Meltzer (1995-2004)
Rabbi Stanley Davids (2004-2008)
Rabbi Robert Orkand (2008-2012)
Rabbi Bennett Miller (2012-2016, 2018-2021)
Rabbi John Rosove (2016 - 2018)
Staff leadership

Current President/Executive Director: Rabbi Joshua Weinberg (2013-present)

Former Executive Directors
Rabbi Ira Youdovin 1977-1983
Rabbi Eric Yoffie 1983-1992
Rabbi Ammiel Hirsch 1992-2004
Rabbi Andrew Davids 2004-2008
Elana Paru - Interim Executive Director January to July 2009
Rabbi Scott Sperling August 2009-June 2010
Rabbi Daniel Allen July 2010-October 2012 
Barbara Kavadias - Interim Acting Executive Director November 2012-August 2013

See also
Reform Zionism
Union for Reform Judaism
World Union for Progressive Judaism
Religious Action Center
American Zionist Movement
World Zionist Organization
World Zionist Congress

References

External links
Official website

Jewish charities based in the United States
Jewish organizations established in 1978

Zionist organizations
Zionism in the United States
Reform Zionism
World Zionist Organization